Six Corners is a shopping district in the Portage Park neighborhood of Chicago's Northwest Side.

History
The area's name is from the intersection of three streets—Irving Park Road, Cicero Avenue and Milwaukee Avenue. Its history as an urban center began in the 1840s, eventually becoming the largest commercial center in Chicago, outside of the Loop.  There is evidence that Native Americans used a ridge along Milwaukee Avenue as a campsite, which would have been higher than the generally swampy surrounding land.

Architecture
The area is host to a number of examples of prominent architecture, including the art deco Sears and Klee Buildings, the classical revival Portage Theater and the landmark Peoples Gas Irving Park Neighborhood Store.

Present
Although the shopping district has fallen on hard times in recent years, the area has been slated for redevelopment as an urban pedestrian shopping district with the recent reopening of the Portage Theater, the upcoming construction of several retail-condo buildings and a street beautification project.

In recent years, the name "Six Corners" has also been applied to the intersection of Milwaukee, North, and Damen avenues in the Wicker Park neighborhood, though some believe that the name refers to the Portage Park intersection.  Given Chicago's unique rectangular grid street system which is cut by a handful of diagonal streets, numerous intersections within the city contain six corners and therefore the term is sometimes applied in a general sense.

References

Shopping malls in Chicago
Streets in Chicago